Senator Timility may refer to:

James E. Timilty (fl. 2000s–2010s), Massachusetts State Senate
James P. Timilty (1865–1921), Massachusetts State Senate
Joseph F. Timilty (state senator) (1938–2017), Massachusetts State Senate
Walter Timilty (born 1969), Massachusetts State Senate